The 2005 All-Big Ten Conference football team consists of American football players chosen as All-Big Ten Conference players for the 2005 NCAA Division I-A football season.  The conference recognizes two official All-Big Ten selectors: (1) the Big Ten conference coaches selected separate offensive and defensive units and named first- and second-team players (the "Coaches" team); and (2) a panel of sports writers and broadcasters covering the Big Ten also selected offensive and defensive units and named first- and second-team players (the "Media" team).

Offensive selections

Quarterbacks
 Brett Basanez, Northwestern (Coaches-1; Media-1)
 Michael Robinson, Penn State (Coaches-2; Media-2)

Running backs
 Brian Calhoun, Wisconsin (Coaches-1; Media-1)
 Laurence Maroney, Minnesota (Coaches-1; Media-1)

Receivers
 Jason Avant, Michigan (Coaches-1; Media-1)
 Santonio Holmes, Ohio State (Coaches-1; Media-1)

Centers
 Greg Eslinger, Minnesota (Coaches-1; Media-1)
 Nick Mangold, Ohio State (Coaches-2; Media-2)

Guards
 Mark Setterstrom, Minnesota (Coaches-1; Media-1)
 Rob Sims, Ohio State (Coaches-1; Media-2)
 Matt Lentz, Michigan (Coaches-2; Media-1)
 Jordan Grimes, Purdue (Coaches-2)
 Leo Henige, Michigan (Media-2)

Tackles
 Joe Thomas, Wisconsin (Coaches-1; Media-1)
 Levi Brown, Penn State (Coaches-1; Media-2)
 Adam Stenavich, Michigan (Coaches-2; Media-1)
 Zach Strief, Northwestern (Coaches-2; Media-2)

Tight ends
 Matt Spaeth, Minnesota (Coaches-1; Media-1)
 Tim Massaquoi, Michigan (Coaches-2; Media-2)

Defensive selections

Defensive linemen
 Mike Kudla, Ohio State (Coaches-1; Media-1) 
 Tamba Hali, Penn State (Coaches-1; Media-1)
 Gabe Watson, Michigan (Coaches-1; Media-1)
 Scott Paxson, Penn State (Coaches-1)
 Kenny Iwebema, Iowa (Media-1)
 Victor Adeyanju, Indiana (Coaches-2; Media-2)
 Anthony Montgomery, Minnesota (Coaches-2)
 Barry Cofield, Northwestern (Coaches-2)
 Quinn Pitcock, Ohio State (Coaches-2)
 Rob Ninkovich, Purdue (Coaches-2; Media-2)
 Jay Alford, Penn State (Media-2)
 Matthew Rice, Penn State (Media-2)

Linebackers
 Chad Greenway, Iowa (Coaches-1; Media-1)
 A. J. Hawk, Ohio State (Coaches-1; Media-1)
 Paul Posluszny, Penn State (Coaches-1; Media-1)
 Abdul Hodge, Iowa (Coaches-2; Media-2)
 Tim McGarigle, Northwestern (Coaches-2; Media-2)
 Bobby Carpenter, Ohio State (Coaches-2; Media-2)

Defensive backs
 Nate Salley, Ohio State (Coaches-1; Media-1)
 Ashton Youboty, Ohio State (tie) (Coaches-1; Media-1)
 Alan Zemaitis, Penn State (Coaches-1; Media-1)
 Calvin Lowry, Penn State (tie) (Coaches-1; Media-2)
 Jovon Johnson, Iowa (Coaches-2; Media-1)
 Donte Whitner, Ohio State (Coaches-1)
 Leon Hall, Michigan (Coaches-2; Media-2)
 Eric Smith, Michigan State (Coaches-2)
 Marquise Cole, Northwestern (Media-2)
 Roderick Rogers, Wisconsin (Media-2)

Special teams

Kickers
 Josh Huston, Ohio State (Coaches-1; Media-1)
 Kyle Schlicher, Iowa (Coaches-2; Media-s)

Punters
 Ken Debauche, Wisconsin (Coaches-1; Media-1)
 Steve Weatherford, Illinois (Coaches-2; Media-2)

Key

See also
 2005 College Football All-America Team

References

All-Big Ten Conference
All-Big Ten Conference football teams